‘Aqīl ibn Mubārak ibn Rumaythah ibn ibn Muḥammad Abī Numayy al-Ḥasanī (d. 1422) was a co-Emir of Mecca during the reign of his cousin Inan ibn Mughamis. He died in 825 AH (1422).

Notes

References

Year of birth missing
1422 deaths
Emirs